Caddo Gap is an unincorporated community and census-designated place (CDP) in Montgomery County, Arkansas, United States. It lies between Glenwood and Norman, on the Caddo River. It was first listed as a CDP in the 2020 census with a population of 39.

History
It is best known as the area in which explorer Hernando de Soto and his forces clashed with the Tula tribe in 1541, a band loosely affiliated with the Caddo Confederacy. The expedition described the Tula Indians as the fiercest they had faced during their inward journey into North America. After this, the expedition turned back east, making it as far as the Mississippi River, where de Soto died. It is contested as to whether he died of fever, or from a wound received during the fighting. There the expedition had a secret burial ceremony and sent his body into the river. A monument to this event stands in the heart of the small community.

Flood

During the night of June 10–11, 2010, a flash flood along Little Missouri River killed at least 20 people in the campgrounds of the Albert Pike Recreation Area near Caddo Gap.

Education
Caddo Gap is in the Caddo Hills School District.

Demographics

2020 census

Note: the US Census treats Hispanic/Latino as an ethnic category. This table excludes Latinos from the racial categories and assigns them to a separate category. Hispanics/Latinos can be of any race.

Notable people
Osro Cobb, lawyer and politician

References

Census-designated places in Arkansas
Census-designated places in Montgomery County, Arkansas
Unincorporated communities in Arkansas
Unincorporated communities in Montgomery County, Arkansas
Arkansas placenames of Native American origin